Nekrich is a surname. Notable people with the surname include:

Alexander Nekrich (1920–1993), Russian historian
Mikhail Nekrich
Natalia Nekrich